The Sweetest Fruits is a 1954 West German comedy film directed by Franz Antel and starring Maria Holst, Wolf Albach-Retty and Hannelore Bollmann.

It was shot at the Bavaria Studios in Munich and on location in Sicily. The film's sets were designed by the art director Arne Flekstad and Sepp Rothauer.

Cast

References

External links

1954 films
1954 musical comedy films
German musical comedy films
West German films
Films directed by Franz Antel
Films shot in Italy
Films set in Europe
Films shot at Bavaria Studios
German black-and-white films
1950s German films
1950s German-language films